The Territorial Prelature of Chuquibambilla is a Roman Catholic territorial prelature located in the city of Chuquibambilla in the Ecclesiastical province of Cuzco in Peru.

History
 On April 26, 1968, the Territorial Prelature of Chuquibambilla was established from the Diocese of Abancay

Ordinaries
 Prelates of Chuquibambilla (Roman rite)
Lorenzo Miccheli Filippetti, O.S.A. (August 12, 1976 – July 16, 1986)
Domenico Berni Leonardi, O.S.A. (March 29, 1989 – April 24, 2018)
Edinson Edgardo Farfán Córdova, O.S.A. (April 24, 2018 – December 7, 2019), Apostolic Administrator; (December 7, 2019 – present)

References

 GCatholic.org
 Catholic Hierarchy

Roman Catholic dioceses in Peru
Roman Catholic Ecclesiastical Province of Cuzco
Christian organizations established in 1968
Roman Catholic dioceses and prelatures established in the 20th century
Territorial prelatures